Chand Grehan is a 1995 Pakistani television series written by Asghar Nadeem Syed and directed by Taj Dar Alam.

Synopsis 
The story is about political dictionary and social status difference it follows Shehrbano (Huma) who comes from a wealthy background wants to marry Nasir (Ayaz) but due to their background they couldn't get married.

Cast 
 Huma Nawab as Shehrbano
 Ayaz Naik as Nasir
 Shafi Muhammad Shah as Lal Hussain Shah Sahab
 Faryal Gohar as Gulbahar Begum
 Tahira Wasti as Khanum
 Shakeel as Babar Sahab
 Sajida Syed as Mrs. Babar
 Abdullah Kadwani as Amjab
 Sheema Kermani as Ameer-ul-Nisa
 Gulab Chandio as Dil Bahar
 Ubaida Ansari as Daniyal's mother
 Mehmood Akhtar as Sodagar
 Qazi Wajid as Kamal Sahab
 Sohail Asghar as Jahanian Shah
 Rubi Niazi as Shireen
 Latif Kapadia as Lateef Bhai
 Roshan Atta as Mai Muradan

Accolades

References

External links
 

1990s Pakistani television series
Pakistan Television Corporation original programming
Nigar Award winners
Urdu-language television shows
Pakistani drama television series